During the 19th century, New Zealand English gained many loanwords from the Māori language. The use of Māori words in New Zealand English has increased since the 1990s, and English-language publications increasingly using macrons to indicate long vowels. Māori words are usually not italicised in New Zealand English, and most publications follow the Māori-language convention of the same word for singular and plural (one kākāpō, three kākāpō).

Plants and animals
Large numbers of native plants and animals retain their Māori names in New Zealand English. Examples include:

 Birds: kākāpō, kea, kererū, kiwi, kōkako, moa, pūkeko, takahē, tūī, weka
 Plants: kahikatea, kānuka, kauri, kūmara, mānuka, mataī, pōhutukawa, toetoe, tōtara, tutu
 Fish: tarakihi, hāpuku
Invertebrates: huhu, katipō

Other terms
"Kia ora" (literally "be healthy") is a Māori term of greeting, meaning "hello" or "welcome". It can also mean "thank you", or signify agreement with a speaker at a meeting. The Māori greetings "tēnā koe" (to one person), "tēnā kōrua" (to two people) or "tēnā koutou" (to three or more people) are also widely used, as are farewells such as "haere rā".

The Māori phrase "kia kaha", "be strong", is frequently encountered as an indication of moral support for someone starting a stressful undertaking or otherwise in a difficult situation. Although previously in common usage it became an iconic phrase of support following the 2010 Canterbury earthquake.

Some hybrid words, part English and part Māori, have developed, the most common of which is probably half-pai — often written half-pie — meaning incomplete or substandard quality, pai being the Māori word for "good". (The portmanteau form half-pied is also used, derived from half-baked.) Similarly, the Māori word ending -tanga, which has a similar meaning to the English ending -ness, is occasionally used in terms such as kiwitanga (that is, the state of being a New Zealander).

Several Māori words are used in English as lighthearted, or even slang, equivalents of their more common English counterparts. The term puku for stomach, for example, is more likely to be encountered during a friendly chat than in more formal circumstances, with one of its uses being a euphemism for a large belly.

English words intimately associated with New Zealand are often of Māori origin, such as haka, Pākehā, Aotearoa, kiwi, and the word Māori itself.

See also
 List of English words of Māori origin
 List of English words of Polynesian origin

References

Further reading
Matthews, R. J. H. (1984). "Maori Influence on New Zealand English". World Englishes 3 (3), 156–159. 

New Zealand English
Māori words and phrases
Lists of loanwords
Language contact